Lelystad Centrum is a railway station in the town of Lelystad, Netherlands. The station is on the Flevolijn and Hanzelijn and the train services are operated by Nederlandse Spoorwegen. The station was opened on 28 May 1988 after the extension from Almere Buiten was completed. The station was doubled in size to 4 platforms to accommodate the increase in trains following the opening of the Hanzelijn on 9 December 2012.

Train services
, the following train services call at this station:
Intercity services The Hague - Schiphol Airport - Amsterdam Zuid - Almere - Lelystad - Zwolle - Groningen
Intercity services The Hague - Schiphol Airport - Amsterdam Zuid - Almere - Lelystad - Zwolle - Leeuwarden
Intercity services Dordrecht - Rotterdam - The Hague - Schiphol Airport - Amsterdam Zuid - Almere - Lelystad
Local Sprinter services The Hague - Schiphol Airport - Amsterdam - Weesp - Almere - Lelystad - Zwolle

Bus services

Town services
1 Lelystad Harbour - Lelystad Station
2 Landerijen - Hospital - Station - Kustwijk
3 Landerijen - Hospital - Station - Batavia Stad
5 Lelycentre - Station - Warande
7 Lelystad Airport - Station - Kempenaar

Regional services
140 Lelystad - Nagele - Emmeloord
145 Lelystad - Swifterbant
148 Lelystad - Harderwijk
163 Lelystad - Dronten
164 Swifterbant -> Lelystad
650 Lelystad - Markerwaarddijk - Enkhuizen - Bovenkarspel - Grootebroek - Andijk - Wervershoof
663 Lelystad - Dronten - Kampen

Both the 650 and 663 are once a day student services.

External links
NS website 
Arriva website 
Connexxion website 
Dutch Public Transport journey planner

Gallery

Railway stations in Flevoland
Railway stations opened in 1988
Railway stations on the Flevolijn
Railway stations on the Hanzelijn
Buildings and structures in Lelystad